The 1996 Speedway Grand Prix of Germany was the third race of the 1996 Speedway Grand Prix season. It took place on 9 July in the Rottalstadion in Pocking, Germany It was second German SGP and was won by Danish rider Hans Nielsen. It was the third win of his career.

Starting positions draw 

The Speedway Grand Prix Commission nominated Gerd Riss as Wild Card who started in German SPG last season.
Draw 5.  (11) Tommy Knudsen →  (13) Joe Screen
Draw 9.  (14) Gary Havelock →  (4) Greg Hancock
Draw 17. track reserve →  (19) Tomasz Gollob
Draw 18. track reserve → Emply

Heat details

The intermediate classification

See also 
 Speedway Grand Prix
 List of Speedway Grand Prix riders

References

External links 
 FIM-live.com
 SpeedwayWorld.tv

Speedway Grand Prix of Germany
Ge
1996